Strobliella is a genus of midges in the family Cecidomyiidae. The one described species - Strobliella intermedia - is found in the Holarctic region. The genus was established in 1898 by Jean-Jacques Kieffer.

References

Cecidomyiidae genera

Insects described in 1898
Taxa named by Jean-Jacques Kieffer
Monotypic Diptera genera